Gélase Daniel Ndabirabe (born 1957) is a Burundian politician from the CNDD–FDD. He has been President of the National Assembly since 7 August 2020.

References 

Living people
1957 births
Place of birth missing (living people)
21st-century Burundian people
National Council for the Defense of Democracy – Forces for the Defense of Democracy politicians
Presidents of the National Assembly (Burundi)